Norman Simmons (October 6, 1929 – May 13, 2021) was an American musician, arranger, composer, educator, and most prominently a pianist who worked extensively with Helen Humes, Carmen McRae, Sarah Vaughan, Anita O'Day, and Joe Williams among others.

Biography
Simmons was born in Chicago, Illinois on October 6, 1929.  During the early 1950s, he was house pianist at the Beehive Lounge on East 55th Street, playing with visiting musicians such as Wardell Gray, Lester Young and with Charlie Parker on his final Chicago performance in February 1955. 

In 1966, his arrangement for Ramsey Lewis' hit of "Wade in the Water" became a large commercial success.  He was a member of the Ellington Legacy Band from 2002.

Discography

As leader
Norman Simmons Trio (Argo, 1956)
Ramira The Dancer (Spotlite, 1976)
Midnight Creeper (Milljac, 1979)
I'm...The Blues (Milljac, 1981)
13th Moon (Milljac, 1986)
The Heat And The Sweet (Milljac, 1997)
The Art Of Norman Simmons (Savant, 2000) - with Eric Alexander	
Manha De Carnaval (Sound Hills [Japan], 2002)		
Synthesis (Savant, 2002) - with Eric Alexander		
In Private (Savant, 2004)

As sideman
With Roy Eldridge
What It's All About (Pablo, 1976)
With Johnny Griffin
Battle Stations (Prestige, 1960) - with Eddie "Lockjaw" Davis
Johnny Griffin’s Studio Jazz Party  (Riverside, 1960)
With Red Holloway
Red Soul (Prestige, 1965)
With Etta Jones
My Buddy: Etta Jones Sings the Songs of Buddy Johnson (HighNote, 1998)
All the Way (HighNote, 1999)
With Carmen McRae
Sings Lover Man and Other Billie Holiday Classics (Philips, 1962)
Live at Sugar Hill San Francisco (Time, 1963)
Second to None (Mainstream, 1964)
Woman Talk, Live at the Village Gate (Mainstream, 1965)
Live & Wailing (Mainstream, 1965, reissued with Woman Talk on Columbia, 1973)
Carmen McRae (Mainstream, 1971)
With Betty Carter
Betty Carter (Bet-Car Productions, 1970)
Round Midnight (Roulette, 1975)
Finally (Roulette, 1988)
With Harold Ousley
The People's Groove (Muse, 1977)
Sweet Double Hipness (Muse, 1980)
With Anita O'Day
Anita O'Day with John Poole Trio Featuring Norman Simmons - Live at Mingo's (Emily, 1979)	
With Scott Hamilton and Warren Vaché
Skyscrapers (Concord Jazz, 1980)
With Clifford Jordan, Von Freeman, Cy Touff, Victor Sproles, and Wilbur Campbell
Hyde Park After Dark (Bee Hive, 1983)
With Dakota Staton
Ms. Soul (Groove Merchant, 1974)
With Joe Williams
Joe Williams & Friends June 1985 - I Just Want to Sing (Delos, 1985)
Every Night: Live At Vine St. (Verve, 1987)
In Good Company (Verve, 1989)
That Holiday Feelin (Verve, 1990)
Ballad And Blues Master (Verve, 1992)
With Al Grey and Bjarne Nerem
Al Meets Bjarne (Gemini, 1987)

As arranger
With Johnny Griffin
The Little Giant (Riverside, 1959)
The Big Soul-Band (Riverside, 1960)
White Gardenia (Riverside, 1961)

With Teri Thornton
Devil May Care (Riverside, 1961)

References

External links
 normansimmons.com
 

1929 births
2021 deaths
American jazz pianists
American male pianists
Musicians from Chicago
20th-century American pianists
Jazz musicians from Illinois
21st-century American pianists
20th-century American male musicians
21st-century American male musicians
American male jazz musicians
Statesmen of Jazz members
Argo Records artists